Gaeland Township is a township in Gove County, Kansas, USA.  As of the 2000 census, its population was 46.

Geography

Transportation
Gaeland Township contains two airports or landing strips: Evans Airport and Stevenson Airport.

References
 USGS Geographic Names Information System (GNIS)

External links
 US-Counties.com
 City-Data.com

Townships in Gove County, Kansas
Townships in Kansas